U-boats were naval submarines operated by Germany, particularly in the First and Second World Wars. Although at times they were efficient fleet weapons against enemy naval warships, they were most effectively used in an economic-warfare role (commerce raiding) and enforcing a naval blockade against enemy shipping. The primary targets of the U-boat campaigns in both wars were the merchant convoys bringing supplies from Canada and other parts of the British Empire, and from the United States, to the United Kingdom and (during the Second World War) to the Soviet Union and the Allied territories in the Mediterranean. German submarines also targeted Brazilian merchant ships during both World Wars and, twice over, precipitated Brazil's decision to give up its neutral stance and declare war on Germany.

The term is an anglicised version of the German word U-Boot , a shortening of Unterseeboot (under-sea boat), though the German term refers to any submarine. Austro-Hungarian Navy submarines were also known as U-boats.

Early U-boats (1850–1914)
The first submarine built in Germany, the three-man Brandtaucher, sank to the bottom of Kiel Harbor on 1 February 1851 during a test dive.
Inventor and engineer Wilhelm Bauer had designed this vessel in 1850, and Schweffel and Howaldt constructed it in Kiel. Dredging operations in 1887 rediscovered Brandtaucher; she was later raised and put on historical display in Germany.

The boats Nordenfelt I and Nordenfelt II, built to a Nordenfelt design, followed in 1890. In 1903, the Friedrich Krupp Germaniawerft dockyard in Kiel completed the first fully functional German-built submarine, Forelle, which Krupp sold to Russia during the Russo-Japanese War in April 1904. The  was a completely redesigned  and only one was built. The Imperial German Navy commissioned it on 14 December 1906. It had a double hull, a Körting kerosene engine, and a single torpedo tube. The 50%-larger  (commissioned in 1908) had two torpedo tubes. The  class of 1912–13 had the first diesel engine installed in a German navy boat. At the start of World War I in 1914, Germany had 48 submarines of 13 classes in service or under construction. During that war, the Imperial German Navy used SM U-1 for training. Retired in 1919, she remains on display at the Deutsches Museum in Munich.

World War I (1914–1918)

In the Gallipoli Campaign in early 1915 in the eastern Mediterranean, German U-boats, notably the U-21, prevented close support of allied troops by 18 pre-dreadnought battleships by sinking two of them.

For the first few months of the war, U-boat anticommerce actions observed the "prize rules" of the time, which governed the treatment of enemy civilian ships and their occupants. On 20 October 1914,  sank the first merchant ship, off Norway. Surface commerce raiders were proving to be ineffective, and on 4 February 1915, the Kaiser assented to the declaration of a war zone in the waters around the British Isles. This was cited as a retaliation for British minefields and shipping blockades. Under the instructions given to U-boat captains, they could sink merchant ships, even potentially neutral ones, without warning.

In February 1915, a submarine U-6 (Lepsius) was rammed and both periscopes were destroyed off Beachy Head by the collier SS Thordis commanded by Captain John Bell after firing a torpedo.  
On 7 May 1915,  sank the liner RMS Lusitania. The sinking claimed 1,198 lives, 123 of them American civilians, and the attack of this unarmed civilian ship deeply shocked the Allies. According to the ship's manifest, Lusitania was carrying military cargo, though none of this information was relayed to the citizens of Britain and the United States, who thought that the ship contained no ammunition or military weaponry whatsoever and it was an act of brutal murder. Munitions that she carried were thousands of crates full of ammunition for rifles, 3-inch (76 mm) artillery shells, and various other standard ammunition used by infantry. The sinking of the Lusitania was widely used as propaganda against the German Empire and caused greater support for the war effort. A widespread reaction in the U.S was not seen until the attack on the ferry , which carried many citizens of the United States.

The initial U.S. response was to threaten to sever diplomatic ties, which persuaded the Germans to issue the Sussex pledge that reimposed restrictions on U-boat activity. The U.S. reiterated its objections to German submarine warfare whenever U.S. civilians died as a result of German attacks, which prompted the Germans to fully reapply prize rules. This, however, removed the effectiveness of the U-boat fleet, and the Germans consequently sought a decisive surface action, a strategy that culminated in the Battle of Jutland.

Although the Germans claimed victory at Jutland, the British Grand Fleet remained in control at sea. Returning to effective anticommerce warfare by U-boats resumed. Vice Admiral Reinhard Scheer, commander in chief of the High Seas Fleet, pressed for all-out U-boat war, convinced that a high rate of shipping losses would force Britain to seek an early peace before the United States could react effectively.

The renewed German campaign was effective, sinking 1.4 million tons of shipping between October 1916 and January 1917. Despite this, the political situation demanded even greater pressure, and on 31 January 1917, Germany announced that its U-boats would engage in unrestricted submarine warfare beginning 1 February. On 17 March, German submarines sank three American merchant vessels, and the U.S. declared war on Germany in April 1917.

Unrestricted submarine warfare in early 1917 was initially very successful, sinking a major part of Britain-bound shipping. With the introduction of escorted convoys, shipping losses declined, and in the end, the German strategy failed to destroy sufficient Allied shipping. An armistice became effective on 11 November 1918. Of the surviving German submarines, 14 U-boats were scuttled and 122 surrendered.

Of the 373 German submarines that had been built, 178 were lost by enemy action. Of these, 40 were sunk by mines, 30 by depth charges, and 13 by Q-ships; 512 officers and 4894 enlisted men were killed. They sank 10 battleships, 18 cruisers, and several smaller naval vessels. They further destroyed 5,708 merchant and fishing vessels for a total of 11,108,865 tons and the loss of about 15,000 sailors. The Pour le Mérite, the highest decoration for gallantry for officers, was awarded to 29 U-boat commanders. Twelve U-boat crewmen were decorated with the Goldene Militär-Verdienst-Kreuz, the highest bravery award for noncommissioned officers and enlisted men. The most successful U-boat commanders of World War I were Lothar von Arnauld de la Perière (189 merchant vessels and two gunboats with 446,708 tons), followed by Walter Forstmann (149 ships with 391,607 tons), and Max Valentiner (144 ships with 299,482 tons). Their records have not been surpassed in any subsequent conflict.

Classes
Körting kerosene-powered boats
Type U 1, Type U 2, Type U 3, Type U 5, Type U 9, Type U 13, Type U 16, Type U 17
Mittel-U MAN diesel boats
Type U 19, Type U 23, Type U 27, Type U 31, Type U 43, Type U 51, Type U 57, Type U 63, Type U 66, Type Mittel U
U-Cruisers and Merchant U-boats
Type U 139, Type U 142, Type U 151, Type UD 1
UB coastal torpedo attack boats
Type UB I, Type UB II, Type UB III, Type UF, Type UG
UC coastal minelayers
Type UC I, Type UC II, Type UC III
UE ocean minelayers
Type UE I, Type UE II

Surrender of the fleet
Under the terms of armistice, all U-boats were to immediately surrender. Those in home waters sailed to the British submarine base at Harwich. The entire process was done quickly and in the main without difficulty, after which the vessels were studied, then scrapped or given to Allied navies. Stephen King-Hall wrote a detailed eyewitness account of the surrender.

Interwar years (1919–1939)
The Treaty of Versailles ending World War I signed at the Paris Peace Conference in 1919 restricted the total tonnage of the German surface fleet. The treaty also restricted the independent tonnage of ships and forbade the construction of submarines. A submarine design office, though, was set up in the Netherlands and a torpedo research program was started in Sweden. Before the start of World War II, Germany started building U-boats and training crews, labeling these activities as "research" or concealing them using other covers. When this became known, the Anglo-German Naval Agreement limited Germany to parity with Britain in submarines. When World War II started, Germany already had 65 U-boats, with 21 of those at sea, ready for war.

World War II (1939–1945)

During World War II, U-boat warfare was the major component of the Battle of the Atlantic, which began in 1939 and ended with Germany's surrender in 1945. The Armistice of 11 November 1918 ending World War I had scuttled most of the old Imperial German Navy and the subsequent Treaty of Versailles of 1919 limited the surface navy of Germany's new Weimar Republic to only six battleships (of less than 10,000 tons each), six cruisers, and 12 destroyers. To compensate, Germany's new navy, the Kriegsmarine, developed the largest submarine fleet going into World War II. British Prime Minister Winston Churchill later wrote "The only thing that really frightened me during the war was the U-boat peril."

In the early stages of the war, the U-boats were extremely effective in destroying Allied shipping due to the large gap in mid-Atlantic air cover. Cross-Atlantic trade in war supplies and food was extensive and critical for Britain's survival. The continuous action surrounding British shipping became known as the Battle of the Atlantic, as the British developed technical defences such as ASDIC and radar, and the German U-boats responded by hunting in what were called "wolfpacks", in which multiple submarines would stay close together, making sinking a specific target easier for them. Britain's vulnerable shipping situation existed until 1942, when the tides changed as the U.S. merchant marine and Navy entered the war, drastically increasing the tonnage of supplies sent across the Atlantic. The combination of increased tonnage and increased naval protection of shipping convoys made making a significant dent in British shipping much more difficult for U-boats. Once the United States entered the war, U-boats ranged from the Atlantic coast of the United States and Canada to the Gulf of Mexico, and from the Arctic to the west and southern African coasts and even as far east as Penang. The U.S. military engaged in various tactics against German incursions in the Americas; these included military surveillance of foreign nations in Latin America, particularly in the Caribbean, to deter any local governments from supplying German U-boats.

Because speed and range were severely limited underwater while running on battery power, U-boats were required to spend most of their time surfaced, running on diesel engines, diving only when attacked or for rare daytime torpedo strikes. The more ship-like hull design reflects the fact that these were primarily surface vessels that could submerge when necessary. This contrasts with the cylindrical profile of modern nuclear submarines, which are more hydrodynamic under water (where they spend the majority of their time), but less stable on the surface. While U-boats were faster on the surface than submerged, the opposite is generally true of modern submarines. The most common U-boat attack during the early years of the war was conducted on the surface and at night. This period, before the Allied forces developed truly effective antisubmarine warfare  tactics, which included convoys, was referred to by German submariners as "die glückliche Zeit" or the First Happy Time.

Torpedoes
The U-boats' main weapon was the torpedo, though mines and deck guns (while surfaced) were also used. By the end of the war, almost 3,000 Allied ships (175 warships; 2,825 merchant ships) had been sunk by U-boat torpedoes. Early German World War II torpedoes were straight runners, as opposed to the homing and pattern-running torpedoes that became available later in the war. They were fitted with one of two types of pistol triggers — impact, which detonated the warhead upon contact with a solid object, and magnetic, which detonated upon sensing a change in the magnetic field within a few meters.

One of the most effective uses of magnetic pistols would be to set the torpedo's depth to just beneath the keel of the target. The explosion under the target's keel would create a detonation shock wave, which could cause a ship's hull to rupture under the concussive water pressure. In this way, even large or heavily armored ships could be sunk or disabled with a single, well-placed hit.

Initially, the depth-keeping equipment and magnetic and contact exploders were notoriously unreliable.  During the first eight months of the war, torpedoes often ran at an improper depth, detonated prematurely, or failed to explode altogether—sometimes bouncing harmlessly off the hull of the target ship. This was most evident in Operation Weserübung, the invasion of Norway, where various skilled U-boat commanders failed to inflict damage on British transports and warships because of faulty torpedoes. The faults were largely due to a lack of testing. The magnetic detonator was sensitive to mechanical oscillations during the torpedo run, and to fluctuations in the Earth's magnetic field at high latitudes. These early magnetic detonators were eventually phased out, and the depth-keeping problem was solved by early 1942 with improved technology.

Later in the war, Germany developed an acoustic homing torpedo, the G7/T5. It was primarily designed to combat convoy escorts. The acoustic torpedo was designed to run straight to an arming distance of 400 m and then turn toward the loudest noise detected. This sometimes ended up being the U-boat; at least two submarines may have been sunk by their own homing torpedoes. The Allies countered acoustic torpedoes with noisemaker decoys such as Foxer, FXR, CAT, and Fanfare. The Germans, in turn, countered this by introducing newer and upgraded versions of the acoustic torpedoes, such as the late-war G7es, and the T11, but the T11 did not see active service.

U-boats also adopted several types of "pattern-running" torpedoes that ran straight out to a preset distance, then traveled in either a circular or ladder-like pattern. When fired at a convoy, this increased the probability of a hit if the weapon missed its primary target.

U-boat developments
During World War II, the Kriegsmarine produced many different types of U-boats as technology evolved. Most notable is the Type VII, known as the "workhorse" of the fleet, which was by far the most-produced type, and the Type IX boats, an enlarged VII designed for long-range patrols, some traveling as far as Japan and the East Coast of the United States.

With the increasing sophistication of Allied detection and subsequent losses, German designers began to fully realise the potential for a truly submerged boat. The Type XXI "Elektroboot" was designed to favor submerged performance, both for combat effectiveness and survival. It was the first true submersible. The Type XXI featured an evolutionary design that combined several different strands of the U-boat development program, most notably from the Walter U-boats, the Type XVII, which featured an unsuccessful yet revolutionary hydrogen peroxide air-independent propellant system. These boats featured a streamlined hull design, which formed the basis of the later  nuclear submarine, and was adapted for use with more conventional propulsion systems. The larger hull design allowed for a greatly increased battery capacity, which enabled the XXI to cruise submerged for longer periods and reach unprecedented submerged speeds for the time. Waste disposal was a problem when the U-boats spent extended periods without surfacing, as it is today.

Throughout the war, an arms race evolved between the Allies and the Kriegsmarine, especially in detection and counterdetection. Sonar (ASDIC in Britain) allowed Allied warships to detect submerged U-boats (and vice versa) beyond visual range, but was not effective against a surfaced vessel; thus, early in the war, a U-boat at night or in bad weather was actually safer on the surface. Advancements in radar became particularly deadly for the U-boat crews, especially once aircraft-mounted units were developed. As a countermeasure, U-boats were fitted with radar warning receivers, to give them ample time to dive before the enemy closed in, as well as more antiaircraft guns, but by early to mid-1943, the Allies switched to centimetric radar (unknown to Germany), which rendered the radar detectors ineffective. U-boat radar systems were also developed, but many captains chose not to use them for fear of broadcasting their position to enemy patrols and lack of sufficient electronic countermeasures.

Early on, the Germans experimented with the idea of the Schnorchel (snorkel) from captured Dutch submarines, but saw no need for them until rather late in the war. The Schnorchel was a retractable pipe that supplied air to the diesel engines while submerged at periscope depth, allowing the boats to cruise and recharge their batteries while maintaining a degree of stealth. It was far from a perfect solution, however. Problems occurred with the device's valve sticking shut or closing as it dunked in rough weather; since the system used the entire pressure hull as a buffer, the diesels would instantaneously suck huge volumes of air from the boat's compartments, and the crew often suffered painful ear injuries. The Schnorchel also had the effect of making the boat essentially noisy and deaf in sonar terms. Finally, Allied radar eventually became sufficiently advanced that the Schnorchel mast could be detected beyond visual range.

Several other pioneering innovations included acoustic- and electro-absorbent coatings to make them less of an ASDIC or radar target. The Germans also developed active countermeasures such as facilities to release artificial chemical bubble-making decoys, known as Bold, after the mythical kobold.

Classes

 Type I: first prototypes
 Type II: small submarines used for training purposes
 Type V: uncompleted experimental midget submarines
 Type VII: the "workhorse" of the U-boats with 709 completed in World War II
 Type IX: these long-range U-boats operated as far as the Indian Ocean with the Japanese (Monsun Gruppe), and the South Atlantic
 Type X: long-range minelayers and cargo transports
 Type XI: uncompleted experimental artillery boats
 Type XIV: used to resupply other U-boats; nicknamed the Milchkuh ("Milk Cow")
 Type XVII: small coastal submarines powered by experimental hydrogen peroxide propulsion systems
 Type XXI: known as the Elektroboot; first subs to operate primarily submerged
 Type XXIII: smaller version of the XXI used for coastal operations 
 Midget submarines, including Biber, Hai, Molch, and Seehund
 Uncompleted U-boat projects

Countermeasures

Advances in convoy tactics, high-frequency direction finding (referred to as ("Huff-Duff"), radar, active sonar (called ASDIC in Britain), depth charges, ASW spigot mortars (also known as "hedgehog"), the intermittent cracking of the German Naval Enigma code, the introduction of the Leigh light, the range of escort aircraft (especially with the use of escort carriers), the use of mystery ships, and the full entry of the U.S. into the war with its enormous shipbuilding capacity, all turned the tide against the U-boats. In the end, the U-boat fleet suffered extremely heavy casualties, losing 793 U-boats and about 28,000 submariners (a 75% casualty rate, the highest of all German forces during the war).  At the same time, the Allies targeted the U-boat shipyards and their bases with strategic bombing.

Enigma machine

The British had a major advantage in their ability to read some German naval Enigma codes. An understanding of the German coding methods had been brought to Britain via France from Polish codebreakers. Thereafter, code books and equipment were captured by raids on German weather ships and from captured U-boats. A team including Alan Turing used special-purpose "Bombes" and early computers to break new German codes as they were introduced. The speedy decoding of messages was vital in directing convoys away from wolf packs and allowing interception and destruction of U-boats. This was demonstrated when the naval Enigma machines were altered in February 1942 and wolf-pack effectiveness greatly increased until the new code was broken.

The , a Type IXB, was captured in 1941 by the Royal Navy, and its Enigma machine and documents were removed.  was also captured by the British in October 1942; three sailors boarded her as she was sinking, and desperately threw all the code books out of the submarine so as to salvage them. Two of them, Able Seaman Colin Grazier and Lieutenant Francis Anthony Blair Fasson, continued to throw code books out of the ship as it went under water, and went down with it. Further code books were captured by raids on weather ships.  was boarded by crew from the Canadian ship  on 6 March 1944, and codes were taken from her, but by this time in the war, most of the information was known. The , a Type IXC, was captured by the United States Navy in June 1944. It is now a museum ship in Chicago at the Museum of Science and Industry.

U-570 a Type VIIC was captured by the British in mid-1941. Although the crew managed to destroy their Enigma machine, the British captured a quantity of papers that proved extremely useful to the cryptanalysts at Bletchley Park. The Royal Navy were able to tow the sinking submarine to Iceland, where it was salvaged and later commissioned into the Royal Navy as HMS Graph, carrying out three war patrols before being relegated to training duties. Mock-ups of the submarine interior were created to train specialist Royal Navy boarding parties in the event a U-boat was blown to the surface to reverse any scuttling attempts by the crew, and to search quickly for cryptographic equipment and documents.

Battle of Bell Island

Two events in the battle took place in 1942 when German U-boats attacked four allied ore carriers at Bell Island, Newfoundland. When the submarine launched a torpedo at the loading pier, Bell Island became the only location in North America to be subject to direct attack by German forces in World War II.

Operation Deadlight

"Operation Deadlight" was the code name for the scuttling of U-boats surrendered to the Allies after the defeat of Germany near the end of the war. Of the 154 U-boats surrendered, 121 were scuttled in deep water off Lisahally, Northern Ireland, or Loch Ryan, Scotland, in late 1945 and early 1946.

Memorial

Post–World War II and Cold War (after 1945)

From 1955, the West German Bundesmarine was allowed to have a small navy. Initially, two sunken Type XXIIIs and a Type XXI were raised and repaired. In the 1960s, the Federal Republic of Germany (West Germany) re-entered the submarine business. Because West Germany was initially restricted to a 450-tonne displacement limit, the Bundesmarine focused on small coastal submarines to protect against the Soviet threat in the Baltic Sea. The Germans sought to use advanced technologies to offset the small displacement, such as amagnetic steel to protect against naval mines and magnetic anomaly detectors.

The initial Type 201 was a failure because of hull cracking; the subsequent Type 205, first commissioned in 1967, was a success, so 12 were built for the German navy. To continue the U-boat tradition, the new boats received the classic "U" designation starting with the U-1.

With the Danish government's purchase of two Type 205 boats, the West German government realized the potential for the submarine as an export, developing a customized version Type 207. Small and agile submarines were built during the Cold War to operate in the shallow Baltic Sea, resulting in the Type 206. Three of the improved Type 206 boats were later sold to the Israeli Navy, becoming the Type 540. The German Type 209 diesel-electric submarine was the most popular export-sales submarine in the world from the late 1960s into the first years of the 21st century. With a larger 1,000–1,500 tonne displacement, the class was very customizable and has seen service with 14 navies, with 51 examples being built as of 2006. Germany continued to reap successes with derivations or on the basis of the successful type 209, as are the Type 800 sold to Israel and the TR-1700 sold to Argentina.

Germany continued to succeed as an exporter of submarines as the Klasse 210 sold to Norway, considered the most silent and maneuverable submarines in the world. This demonstrated its capacity and put its export seal on the world.

Germany has brought the U-boat name into the 21st century with the new Type 212; it 212 features an air-independent propulsion system using hydrogen fuel cells. This system is safer than previous closed-cycle diesel engines and steam turbines, cheaper than a nuclear reactor, and quieter than either. While the Type 212 is also being purchased by Italy and Norway, the Type 214 has been designed as the follow-on export model and has been sold to Greece, South Korea, and Turkey, and based on it would get the Type U 209PN sold to Portugal.

In recent years Germany introduced new models such as the Type 216 and the Type 218, the latter being sold to Singapore.

In 2016, Germany commissioned its newest U-boat, the U-36, a Type 212.

See also

 List of U-boats of Germany
 List of U-boats never deployed
 List of successful U-boats
 Das Boot, 1981 German U-boat film
 Greyhound, 2020 American war film
 Decoys
 Bold (decoy)
 Sieglinde (decoy)
 Karl Dönitz
 List of Knight's Cross recipients of the U-boat service
 Orkney Wireless Museum contains an example of a U-boat radio
 I-boat, Japanese equivalent

References

Further reading
Abbatiello, John (2005) Anti-Submarine Warfare in World War I: British Naval Aviation and the Defeat of the U-Boats
Buchheim, Lothar-Günther. Das Boot (original German edition 1973, eventually translated into English and many other Western languages). Movie adaptation in 1981, directed by Wolfgang Petersen
Gannon, Michael (1998) Black May. Dell Publishing. 
Gannon, Michael (1990) Operation Drumbeat. Naval Institute Press. 
Gray, Edwyn A. (1994) The U-Boat War, 1914–1918
Hans Joachim Koerver (2010) German Submarine Warfare 1914–1918 in the Eyes of British Intelligence, LIS Reinisch, 
Kurson, Robert (2004) Shadow Divers: The True Adventure of Two Americans Who Risked Everything to Solve One of the Last Mysteries of World War II. Random House Publishing. 
Möller, Eberhard and Werner Brack (2006) The Encyclopedia of U-Boats: From 1904 to the Present, 
 O'Connor, Jerome M. (June 2000) "Inside the Grey Wolves' Den." Naval History. The US Naval Institute Author of the Year feature describes the building and operation of the German U-boat bases in France.
Preston, Anthony (2005) The World's Greatest Submarines.
Stern, Robert C. (1999) Battle Beneath the Waves: U-boats at war. Arms and Armor/Sterling Publishing. .
Showell, Jak Mallmann (2006) The U-boat Century: German Submarine Warfare, 1906–2006, 
van der Vat, Dan (1988) The Atlantic Campaign. Harper & Row. Connects submarine and antisubmarine operations between World War I and World War II, and suggests a continuous war.
Von Scheck, Karl. U122: The Diary of a U-boat Commander. Diggory Press, 
Georg von Trapp and Elizabeth M. Campbell (2007) To the Last Salute: Memories of an Austrian U-Boat Commander
Westwood, David (2005) U-Boat War: Doenitz and the evolution of the German Submarine Service 1935–1945, 
Werner, Herbert. Iron Coffins: A Personal Account of the German U-Boat Battles of World War II,

External links

 U-112 and U-53 Submarine Collection at Dartmouth College Library

 01
Submarines of Germany
Submarines of the Imperial German Navy
Submarines of the Kriegsmarine
German Empire in World War I
Germany in World War II
Submarines by type
World War I submarines
World War II submarines